Ovalau Island may refer to

 Ovalau (Vava'u), an island in Tonga
 Ovalau (Fiji), an island in Fiji